Sirhookera is a genus of flowering plants from the orchid family, Orchidaceae. Two species are known, native to India and Sri Lanka.
Sirhookera lanceolata (Wight) Kuntze 1891 - India and Sri Lanka
Sirhookera latifolia (Wight) Kuntze 1891 - India and Sri Lanka

References

External links 

Adrorhizinae
Orchids of India
Orchids of Sri Lanka
Vandeae genera